Kira Thurman is an American historian and musicologist.  She was a 2017 Anna-Maria Kellen Fellow.

She graduated from University of Rochester and Eastman School of Music.  She is a professor at University of Michigan.

Works 

 Singing Like Germans : Black Musicians in the Land of Bach, Beethoven, and Brahms  Cornell University Press, 2021.

References 

American women historians
American women musicologists
University of Rochester alumni
Eastman School of Music alumni
University of Michigan faculty
Living people
Year of birth missing (living people)
Place of birth missing (living people)